Rabindranath Tagore  (7 May 1861 – 7 August 1941) was a Bengali polymath who worked as a poet, writer, playwright, composer, philosopher, social reformer and painter. He reshaped Bengali literature and music as well as Indian art with Contextual Modernism in the late 19th and early 20th centuries. Author of the "profoundly sensitive, fresh and beautiful" poetry of Gitanjali, he became in 1913 the first non-European and the first lyricist to win the Nobel Prize in Literature. His novels,  poems,  plays and short stories have been made into 44 films. Moreover, he has neen featured as a lyricist and songwriter in more than 100 films. The following is a list of films made from Tagore's works:

Films

As writer

Web Series and Television Shows

As writer

References

External links
 

Filmographies
Indian filmographies